The 2015–16 FC Schalke 04 season was the 112th season in the club's football history. In 2015–16 the club plays in the Bundesliga, the top tier of German football. It is the club's 23rd consecutive season in the Bundesliga, having been promoted from the 2. Bundesliga in 1991.

Transfers

In

Out

Kit
Supplier: Adidas / Sponsor: Gazprom

Kit information
Adidas continues its supply of the Schalke 04 kit, a relationship dating back to the 1975–76 season. Gazprom is the current sponsor, dating back to the middle of the 2006–07 season.
Home: Previous season's blue home shirt, white shorts and blue socks confirmed as the current home kit with white three Adidas stripes due to Schalke 04's two-season home kit tradition.
Home alternate: Same as home but including blue alternate shorts.
Away: The away kit features a Marseille-inspired traditional home kit with light grey hoop, aqua blue three Adidas stripes, aqua blue shorts with white three Adidas stripes and white socks.
Away alternate: Same as away kit but including white shorts with aqua blue three Adidas stripes and white socks.
Away alternate 2: Same as away kit but including aqua blue shorts with white three Adidas stripes and aqua blue socks.
Third: The third kit with white three Adidas stripes features a gradiented-hoop pattern, running from dark green to green, with black sleeve, all black back panel and all black shorts.
Third alternate: Same as third kit but including green shorts with white three Adidas stripes and green socks.

Kit usage

Kit record

Friendlies

Florida Cup 2016

Competitions

Bundesliga

League table

Results summary

Results by round

Matches

DFB-Pokal

UEFA Europa League

Group stage

Knockout phase

Round of 32

Team statistics

Squad statistics

Players in white left the club during the season.

References 

FC Schalke 04 seasons
Schalke
Schalke